Senyum di Pagi Bulan Desember is a 1974 Indonesian drama film directed by Wim Umboh. The film won three awards at the Indonesian Film Festival in 1975.

Accolades

References 

Indonesian-language films
1974 films
1974 drama films
Indonesian drama films